Mir Naseer Khan Khoso is a Chhutani Khoso from Madadpur village in the Thul Sub Division  of Jacobabad District.  A well known politician, he became a Member of Provincial Assembly (MPA) in 1997 for the first time and became Minister of Sindh.  In 2002 he was elected MPA second time.

References

Living people
Pakistani politicians
Year of birth missing (living people)